Naseh Gowd may refer to:
 Naseh Gowd-e Harmun-e Jowkar
 Naseh Gowd-e Vali Khan-e Jowkar